Ordosemys is an extinct genus of sea turtle from the Cretaceous period.

References

Extinct turtles
Early Cretaceous turtles
Early Cretaceous reptiles of Asia
Yixian fauna
Paleontology in Shandong
Fossil taxa described in 1994